Hanover Park may refer to:

 Hanover Park, Cape Town in South Africa
 Hanover Park, Illinois in the United States

Education
 Hanover Park High School in the Hanover Park Regional High School District, United States
 Hanover Park Regional High School District in Morris County, New Jersey, United States.

Other
 Hanover Park F.C. a soccer club based in Hanover Park, Cape Town, South Africa.
 Hanover Park (Metra) a station Hanover Park, Illinois, United States